Nikita Aleksandrovich Mikhailovskii (born 10 September 2000) is a Russian professional basketball player for Avtodor Saratov of the VTB United League.

Professional career

Avtodor Saratov (2017–present) 
On 8 May 2019, Mikhailovskii was named VTB United League Young Player of the Year as the league's top player under age 22.

Tasmania JackJumpers (2021–2022) 
On 29 July 2021, Mikhailovskii signed as a Next Star with the Tasmania JackJumpers of the Australian National Basketball League (NBL). He remained under contract with BC Avtodor, and his transfer to the Tasmania JackJumpers was technically a loan, with the provision that he might still play in Russia at the end of the season. In March 2022, he was released from the club "by mutual agreement".

National team career 
In seven games at the 2018 Albert Schweitzer Tournament in Germany, Mikhailovskii averaged 17.3 points, 7.1 rebounds, and 1.7 steals per game for the Russian national under-18 team, who finished in fourth place, and made the All-Tournament Team.

Mikhailovskii was named to the All-Star Five at the 2018 FIBA Europe Under-18 Championship in Riga, Latvia after averaging 16.3 points, 7.4 rebounds and 2.1 assists per game and leading Russia to fourth place.

He played for the Russian under-19 team at the 2019 FIBA Under-19 World Cup in Heraklion, Greece. On 30 June 2019, Mikhailovskii recorded 20 points, 13 rebounds, and 12 assists in an 83–75 win over Greece. It was the first triple-double at the tournament since Dario Šarić in 2013.

References

External links 
VTB United League profile
Avtodor Saratov profile

Living people
2000 births
BC Avtodor Saratov players
People from Pavlovo, Nizhny Novgorod Oblast
Russian men's basketball players
Shooting guards
Sportspeople from Nizhny Novgorod Oblast